James (Jim) H. Merrill was a Republican politician. He was a member of the South Carolina House of Representatives from the 99th District, serving from 2001 to 2017.

He was suspended from office in 2016 after being indicted on ethics charges and resigned his position on August 31, 2017. He ultimately pleaded guilty to one count for not reporting income.
He now lobbies in the state and runs campaigns, the most notable being President Donald Trump’s successful primary in the state of South Carolina in 2016. He also was involved in the largest state settlement in the history of South Carolina, earning 200 million dollars for the state from the federal government.

References

External links
South Carolina Legislature - Majority Leader James H. Merrill official SC Legislature website
Project Vote Smart - Representative James H. Merrill (SC) profile
Follow the Money - James H. Merrill
2006 2004 2002 2000 campaign contributions

 James Merrill at Ballotpedia

Republican Party members of the South Carolina House of Representatives
21st-century American politicians
1967 births
Living people
American lobbyists
South Carolina politicians convicted of crimes